The England national korfball team is managed by the English Korfball Association (EKA), representing England in korfball international competitions. 
In 2007 the Great Britain national korfball team was split into 3 national teams: England, Wales and Scotland, that compete in all international competitions except the World Games, where they compete as a unified Great Britain national korfball team.

Tournament history

 Before 2007 they played as Great Britain national korfball team.

 For World games see Great Britain national korfball team.

 Before 2007 they played as Great Britain national korfball team.

Current squad
National team at the World Championships 2015

 Coach: Dave Buckland

See also
 Great Britain national korfball team

References

External links
 English Korfball Association

National korfball teams
Korfball
National Team